Joseph or Joe Redmond may refer to: 
 Joe Redmond (American football) (Joseph R. Redmond, born ), American football coach
 Joe Redmond (footballer) (Joseph Patrick Redmond, born 2000), Irish footballer 
 J. R. Redmond (Joseph Robert Redmond, born 1977), American football running back